Luiz Roberto Bolognesi is a Brazilian screenwriter. He won several awards as a screenwriter, including "Best Screenplay" in Grande Prêmio Cinema Brasil, Recife Cinema Festival and Troféu APCA.

Filmography 
 Rio 2096: A Story of Love and Fury (2013) (writer, director)
 Bingo: The King of the Mornings (2017) (writer)
 Ex Shaman (2018)
 "The Last Forest" (2021) (Director)

References

External links
 

Brazilian screenwriters
Living people
Year of birth missing (living people)